Marion Miller Knowles  (1865–1949) was an Australian journalist, poet, writer and Catholic charity worker.

Early life and education 
Born on 8 August 1865 in the Victorian gold-mining town of Woods Point, Knowles was the daughter of James and Anne (née Bowen) Miller. Her father was a storekeeper.

Career 
She was a journalist for the Melbourne Advocate for 30 years and conducted the Women’s and Children’s pages until her retirement in 1927. She also was a charity worker for the Melbourne Catholic Orphanage and the Wattle Day appeals.

In 1893 her first poems appeared in The Australasian under the name "John Desmond".

In 1931 she received a pension from the Commonwealth Literary Fund.

Knowles was made a Member of the Order of the British Empire in the 1938 Birthday Honours, being recognised as "a well-known Australian writer of books for girls".

Works

Novels 

 Barbara Halliday: A story of the hill country of Victoria (1896)
 Corinne of Corall's Bluff (1912)
 The Little Doctor (1919)
 The House of Garden of Roses (1923)
 Meg of Minadong (1926)
 Pierce O'Grady's Daughter (1928)
 Pretty Nan Hartigan (1928)

Poetry 

 Songs from the Hills (1898)
 Fronds from the Black's Spur (1911)
 Roses on the Window Sill (1913)
 A Christmas Bouquet (1915)
 Shamrock Sprays (1916)
 Songs from the Land of the Wattle (1916)
 Love, Luck and Lavender (1919)
 Christmas Bells (1919)
 Ferns and Fancies (1923)
 Selected Poems (1935), republished in two volumes:
 The Harp of the Hills (1937)
 Lyrics of Wind and Wave (1937)

Short stories 

 Shamrock and Wattle Bloom: A series of short tales and sketches (1900)

Personal 
Knowles married Joseph Knowles at St Patrick’s Cathedral on 19 September 1901. Her husband died on 18 June 1918 at a private hospital in Melbourne, aged 60.

Knowles died on 16 September 1949 and was survived by her two sons, Adrian and William. Following a requiem mass at the Sacred Heart Church in Kew, she was buried in Brighton Cemetery.

References 

1865 births
1949 deaths
20th-century Australian journalists
20th-century Australian poets
20th-century Australian novelists
Australian women writers
20th-century Australian women
Australian Members of the Order of the British Empire
Writers from Victoria (Australia)
19th-century Australian women
19th-century Australian writers